Robert Joseph Chlupsa (born September 16, 1945) is a former Major League Baseball pitcher. Chlupsa played for the St. Louis Cardinals in 1970 and 1971.

References

External links

1945 births
Living people
Baseball players from New York (state)
St. Louis Cardinals players
Major League Baseball pitchers
Manhattan Jaspers baseball players
Arkansas Travelers players
Cedar Rapids Cardinals players
Florida Instructional League Cardinals players
Gulf Coast Cardinals players
Hawaii Islanders players
Tulsa Oilers (baseball) players
Manhattan Jaspers basketball players
Cardinal Hayes High School alumni